The Turkmenistan national under-21 football team represents Turkmenistan in international under-21 football competitions. It is controlled by the Football Federation of Turkmenistan and is a member of the Asian Football Confederation.

Coaching staff
 Head coach: Ahmet Agamyradow
 Coach: Fazil Mamedov
 Administrator:  Babanazar Haknazarov
 Doctor: Maksatmyrat Ilyasov

Current squad

The selections for 2015 Commonwealth of Independent States Cup on January 16–25, 2015.

|-----
! colspan="9" bgcolor="#B0D3FB" align="left" |

|-----
! colspan="9" bgcolor="#B0D3FB" align="left" |

|-----
! colspan="9" bgcolor="#B0D3FB" align="left" |

Results and upcoming fixtures

See also
Turkmenistan national football team
Turkmenistan national under-23 football team
Turkmenistan national under-19 football team
Turkmenistan national under-17 football team

References

u21
Asian national under-21 association football teams